Ross Yockey (1943 – April 13, 2008) was a writer, producer, author, and television journalist. He authored 21 books, most notably best selling business book McColl, the Man with America's Money, a biography about banker Hugh McColl. Yockey has written nonfiction, among them biographies of Zubin Mehta and André Previn, and fiction, including three novels about the New Kids on the Block.

In the 1970s Yockey won five Emmy Awards with his documentary Hide Them or Help Them, which uncovered mistreatment of the mentally handicapped. Yockey has also received other prestigious awards from organizations such as the Associated Press, the New York International Film Festival, and the Broadcaster's Promotion Association.

Yockey has taught writing at all academic levels, from elementary school to the graduate level. He received his B.A. from Loyola University New Orleans and his MFA in Creative Fiction from Queens University of Charlotte. He moved to Seattle in 2003 where he and his daughter, L. Beth Yockey Jones, ran Yockey Communication, a firm specializing in books for business.  His wife, JoAnn Yockey, was a soprano who performed with the New Orleans opera company.

At the time of his death, he was working on a book about his experiences with Idiopathic Pulmonary Fibrosis.

Partial bibliography
André Previn (1981)
The Builder: The Crosslands and How They Shaped a Region (2005)
A Century of Quality: American & Efird People (1991)
Craving Community: The New American Dream (2007)
McColl: The Man With America’s Money (1999)
Miracle in Jerusalem: An Easter Story (1992)
On Any Given Day (2000)
Responsible to the Earth: The Remarkable History of the Port Blakely Companies (2007)
Ruined Landscapes: Paintings of the Balkan War Zone (2000)
Strictly for the Birds (2004)
Zubin (1978)

Notes and references

http://campus.queens.edu/library/misc/fol/b&a.htm
http://yockeycommunication.com/index.php?page=why-yockey
http://www.blairpub.com/bio&memoir/onanygivenday.htm

American male screenwriters
1943 births
2008 deaths
Queens University of Charlotte alumni
American male journalists
20th-century American journalists
20th-century American biographers
21st-century American biographers
20th-century American male writers
20th-century American screenwriters
American male biographers